Lace was a Canadian country music group who formed in 1998 with the backing of music producer David Foster. Active between 1998 and 2001, the band charted four singles on national country music charts, in addition to releasing a self-titled studio album on 143 Records (in association with Warner Bros. Records Nashville).

Biography 
Foster's plan to put together an all-female country trio began to take shape after seeing a music video of Beverley Mahood on CMT Canada while he was visiting his mother in Victoria, British Columbia; he requested to meet with Mahood, and soon after signed her to a recording contract on his label, 143 Records. Mahood later suggested her friend Giselle, a fellow singer-songwriter in Ontario, prior to David Foster introducing them to the group's third member, Austin, Texas native Corbi Dyann. The trio received a Juno Award nomination in 2000 for Best Country Group or Duo. They also received nominations for Group of the Year and Video of the Year ("I Want a Man") at the 2000 Canadian Country Music Awards.

Their 1999 self-titled album includes record producing credits of Foster, Chris Farren, Humberto Gatica, and J. Richard Hutt. Songwriting credits on the album include Linda Thompson, Deana Carter, Sarah McLachlan and John Scott Sherrill. The group's best-known song was "I Want a Man".

In 2000, Corbi Dyann left the group and Canadian Stacey Lee replaced her.

The trio often was seen as attempting to capitalize on the success of the Dixie Chicks, even though the latter's success occurred after Lace was formed.

Discography

Albums

Singles

Music videos

Awards and nominations

References

External links 
 Beverley Mahood on Myspace

Canadian country music groups